Nodar may refer to:

Nodar Akhalkatsi (1937–1998), Georgian football manager
Nodar Dumbadze (1928–1984), Georgian writer and one of the most popular authors in the late 20th-century Georgia
Nodar Dzhordzhikiya (born 1921), Soviet basketball player
Nodar Gvakhariya (born 1932), Georgian water polo player
Nodar Kancheli (born 1938), Russian architect who designed the Transvaal Park water park in Yasenevo and Basmanny Market
Nodar Khashba (born 1951), former prime minister of Georgia's breakaway republic of Abkhazia
Nodar Khizanishvili (born 1953), retired Soviet football player of Georgian ethnicity
Nodar Kumaritashvili (1988–2010), Georgian Olympic athlete in luge, killed in an accident while training for the 2010 Winter Olympics
Nodar Mammadov, young Azerbaijani defender
Nodar Mgaloblishvili (born 1931), Soviet, Russian and Georgian theatrical actor

See also
Robert Nodar, Jr. (1916–1974), Republican member of the United States House of Representatives from New York

Georgian masculine given names